The Tagnone is a small river in the department of Haute-Corse, Corsica, France.
It is a tributary of the river Tavignano.

Course

It crosses the communes of Aghione, Aléria, Pietroso and Vezzani.
The Tagnone rises in the commune of Vezzani to the northeast of the  Punta Paglia.
It run east past the village of Vezzani, then runs in a generally southeast direction to its confluence with the Tavignano south of Aléria, near the mouth of the Tavignano on the Tyrrhenian Sea.
The D343 road follows the Tagnone for much of its course.

Valley

The Tagnone valley lies between the Tavignanu and Fium'Orbu valleys.
It is smaller than these valleys and more isolated.
The head of the valley is the ridge that connects the  Punta della Pinghella to the  Punta Paglia.
To the north the valley is flanked by relatively low slopes.
The villages of Vezzani and Pietroso cling to the slopes in the upper part of the narrow valley.

The environment on the north-facing slopes favors forestry, and laricio pines of the Rospa-Sorba national forest grow on the foothills of Punta Paglia above the villages.
The valley floor is not wide and flat enough for agriculture, which is confined to terraces around Vezzani, Pietroso and a few hamlets.
The slopes and river banks are covered by maquis shrubland.
There are some traces of copper mining beside the RD343.

Hydrology

The river has been measured at Aghione [Pont RD443] from 2018 to 2021.

Tributaries
The following streams (ruisseaux) are tributaries of the Tagnone (ordered by length) and sub-tributaries:

 Codolo 
 Puzzichello 
 Spallina 
 Caselle 
 Don Carlo 
 La Bacciana 
 San Salvadore 
 Barello 
 Alziccia 
 Botte 
 Santa Maria 
 Samuleto 
 Aghione 
 Forcalo 
 Pietra Piana 
 Le Vieux Tagnone 
 Forci 
 Lojani 
 Bicolani 
 Catastajo 
 Vetrice 
 Affitte

Notes

Sources

Rivers of Haute-Corse
Rivers of France